Johnnie Torjussen (born 24 June 1999) is an English badminton player.

Career
In 2020, he lost the finals at the Slovak Open to Jan Louda. In 2021, he became the national champion of England after winning the men's singles at the 2021 English National Badminton Championships by defeating Alex Lane. This earned him a place in representing England at the 2021 Sudirman Cup.

In 2022, he was selected as part of the squad to represent England in the 2022 Thomas Cup.

Achievements

BWF International Challenge/Series (1 title, 2 runners-up) 
Men's singles

Men's doubles

  BWF International Challenge tournament
  BWF International Series tournament
  BWF Future Series tournament

References

Living people
1999 births
English male badminton players
Alumni of the University of Nottingham
English people of Norwegian descent